The Fredericksburg Line is a commuter rail line operated by Virginia Railway Express between Washington, D.C. and Fredericksburg, VA. Virginia Railway Express operates 8 weekday trains, and Amtrak trains serve a few of the stations on the line. Trackage is owned by CSX as part of their RF&P Subdivision.

History

RF&P

What is today the Fredericksburg Line was originally part of the Richmond, Fredericksburg & Potomac Railroad (or RF&P), a connector railroad between the Pennsylvania and Baltimore and Ohio Railroads in Washington, D.C., and the Seaboard Air Line and Atlantic Coast Line Railroads in Richmond. In 1991 CSX absorbed the RF&P and the line is now their RF&P Subdivision.

Virginia Railway Express

In 1992 Virginia Railway Express (or VRE) was formed to serve the former RF&P between Washington's Union Station and Fredericksburg, VA as well as stations between Washington and Manassas, VA on Norfolk Southern's Piedmont Division.  In 2015, the route was extended to Spotsylvania.

Amtrak
Along with VRE, many Amtrak trains also utilize this line. Their Northeast Regional trains stop at 6 of the 12 stations on the line and Alexandria is a major stop for 6 of their long distance trains.

Expansion
Work was completed on a third track between Alexandria and Franconia-Springfield in 2010. This track enables VRE and Amtrak trains to bypass slow freight trains over Franconia Hill. VRE would also like to add another third track between Powells Creek in Prince William County and Arkendale Road in Stafford County in the near future.

Stations list

See also
 RF&P Subdivision

References

Rail infrastructure in Virginia
Rail infrastructure in Washington, D.C.
1992 establishments in Virginia